A Bird in a Guilty Cage is a 1952 Looney Tunes animated short directed by Friz Freleng. The short was released on August 30, 1952, and stars Tweety and Sylvester. The title is a pun on the song "A Bird in a Gilded Cage".

Plot
Sylvester is at a store called Stacy's, where he notices Tweety in the window stand. Going through the package slot, he closes the curtains and climbs up to Tweety's cage, who asks him what he's going to do. After asiding to the audience, "How naive can ya get?", Sylvester replies that they're going to play a game called Sandwich, involving Tweety getting sandwiched in two slices of bread and nearly eaten ("I don't wike dat game!").

Tweety flees, with Sylvester in hot pursuit. The cat is forced to stack mannequins on top of each other to reach the canary, who is hiding in the lighting. Tweety climbs down and puts skates on the mannequin statue to push the structure down some stairs. He returns however, and the chase resumes, leading him to a hat sale, where he begins trying on hats. He finds the one with Tweety on top, and tries to smash him, instead hitting himself. Tweety then hides in a dollhouse, which eventually ends with Sylvester shooting his own finger.

A final sequence involves a gun in a hole gag, where as Sylvester shoves his gun in a hole in the wall, another is aimed at his rear. Predictably, this ends in Sylvester getting his buttocks shot. Tweety then goes through the pneumatic tubes of Stacy's,  with Sylvester going to the other end to catch him. However, Tweety comes out a different hole, and puts a stick of dynamite in. Sylvester swallows it, thinking he has gotten Tweety, but as he strolls out, it explodes, leaving him blackened. He then decides to cross off birds from his diet, saying to himself that "That one sort of upset my stomach!".

Trivia

 Sylvester would check birds off his diet list in two other cartoons, Tweet Zoo and Trip for Tat.
 Mel Blanc's voice for Tweety was raised to an extra pitch in this cartoon and would stay at that pitch until Muzzle Tough released in 1954. It actually first happened in the 1950 short Canary Row, but went back to the original edited pitch in the 1951 short, Putty Tat Trouble.

Home media
Looney Tunes Golden Collection: Volume 2 DVD

References

External links

 

Short films directed by Friz Freleng
Looney Tunes shorts
Warner Bros. Cartoons animated short films
1952 animated films
1952 short films
Films set in department stores
1952 films
Animated films about cats
Animated films about birds
Films scored by Carl Stalling
1950s Warner Bros. animated short films
Tweety films
Sylvester the Cat films
1950s English-language films